Sugawara Risa (born 15 August 1977) is a Japanese gymnast. She competed at the 1996 Summer Olympics, where she finished 29th in the individual all around.

Competition history

References

External links
 

1977 births
Living people
Japanese female artistic gymnasts
Olympic gymnasts of Japan
Gymnasts at the 1996 Summer Olympics
Sportspeople from Saitama Prefecture
Asian Games medalists in gymnastics
Gymnasts at the 1994 Asian Games
Gymnasts at the 1998 Asian Games
Asian Games silver medalists for Japan
Asian Games bronze medalists for Japan
Medalists at the 1994 Asian Games
Medalists at the 1998 Asian Games
20th-century Japanese women